The Dayabumi Complex is a major landmark in Kuala Lumpur, Malaysia. It houses several commercial facilities and is one of the earliest skyscrapers in the city.

History
Previously, it was a site of Malayan Railway workshops and depots from the 1900s until 1981. Construction began on 14 February 1982. Central Market, which is near the banks of Klang River avoided demolition during Dayabumi Complex's construction. The building was completed in February 1984. It was owned by Urban Development Authority of Malaysia (UDA). However, in the year 2005, the building was taken over by the KLCC Properties Holdings Berhad (KLCCP), a member of Petronas Group.

Dayabumi Complex was designed by Arkitek MAA and BEP Akitek under the joint venture firm BEP+MAA. The landscaped public realm was designed by the urbanist Peter Verity of PDRconsultants . The building was built by Kumagai Gumi Malaysia.

Dayabumi Complex structures 
Dayabumi Tower (35 storeys)
General Post Office
City Point shopping complex - demolished in 2015, pending new tower redevelopment
Connection to KTM Komuter station and LRT/MRT station

Transportation
The building is accessible within walking distance north of Pasar Seni LRT Station.

See also
List of tallest buildings in Kuala Lumpur

References

Commercial buildings completed in 1984
Skyscraper office buildings in Kuala Lumpur
1984 establishments in Malaysia